KSSI (102.1 FM, "I-Rock") is a commercial radio station that is licensed to China Lake, California, United States and serves the Ridgecrest area as well as the US-395 corridor in the High Desert region. The station is owned by Sound Enterprises and broadcasts a mainstream rock format.

History
KSSI first signed on in 1995 on the 102.7 FM frequency with a classic rock format.

In 2015, KSSI moved from 102.7 FM to 102.1 FM.

References

External links

SSI
Classic rock radio stations in the United States
Ridgecrest, California
Radio stations established in 1975